Hammer digit, also known as hammer deformity, can refer to:

Hammer toe
Hammer finger